Walter Zastrau (born 30 May 1935) is a retired German football defender.

Career

Statistics

References

External links
 

1935 births
German footballers
Rot-Weiss Essen players
FC Schalke 04 players
VfL Bochum players
Germany international footballers
Germany B international footballers
Living people
Association football defenders
Association football midfielders